2,2-Dichloro-1,1,1-trifluoroethane or HCFC-123 is considered as an alternative to CFC-11 in low pressure refrigeration and HVAC systems, and should not be used in foam blowing processes or solvent applications. It is also the primary component of the Halotron I fire-extinguishing mixture.

Its ozone depletion potential is ODP = 0.012, and global warming potential is GWP = 76. HCFC-123 will eventually be phased out under the current schedule of the Montreal Protocol, but can continue to be used in new HVAC equipment until 2020 in developed countries, and will still be produced for service use of HVAC equipment until 2030.  Developing countries can use in new equipment until 2030, and can be produced for use in service until 2040.

HCFC-123 is used in large tonnage centrifugal chiller applications, and is the most efficient refrigerant currently in use in the marketplace for HVAC applications. HCFC-123 is also used as a testing agent for bypass leakage of carbon adsorbers in gas filtration systems, and as the primary chemical in Halotron I fire-extinguishing agent.

Storage tanks carrying HCFC-123 should be a light grey.

Isomers are 1,2-dichloro-1,1,2-trifluoroethane (R-123a) with CAS 354-23-4 and 
1,1-dichloro-1,2,2-trifluoroethane (R-123b) with CAS 812-04-4.

References

External links
 
 2,2-Dichloro-1,1,1-trifluoroethane (HCFC-123)
 IR absorption spectra

Hydrochlorofluorocarbons
Refrigerants
Trifluoromethyl compounds